Cruzești is a commune in Chișinău municipality, Moldova. It is composed of two villages, Ceroborta and Cruzești.

References

Communes of Chișinău Municipality